Maximum Bob may refer to:
 Maximum Bob (TV series)
 Maximum Bob (novel)
 Maximum Bob (singer)